Thomas Liddell (October 18, 1800 – June 11, 1880) was the first Principal of Queen's University, then Queen's College.

Life

Liddell was born in Stirlingshire, Scotland in 1800, the son of John Liddell and his wife Janet Martin. He studied at both Edinburgh University and Glasgow University.

He moved from Montrose Chapel of Ease to Lady Glenorchy's Church in Edinburgh in December 1831. He worked alongside the elderly Rev Thomas Snell Jones. His senior, James Bonar WS, was at this time organising the physical relocation of the church due to the known coming of Waverley Railway Station. Edinburgh University awarded him an honorary Doctorate of Divinty in 1841.

He left Edinburgh in 1841 to sail to Canada, where he was appointed the first Principal of Queen's College, Kingston. Here he worked with only one other member of staff, Peter Colin Campbell. Due to issues arising from the Disruption of 1843 in Scotland, funding dried up. Liddell resigned in 1846 and returned to Scotland.

He was minister of Lochmaben in Dumfries and Galloway from 1850 to 1880. He died in Edinburgh on 11 June 1880.

Family

He was married to Susan Ann Jane Stewart, with whom he had two daughters.

Recognition

A street in Kingston, Ontario is named for him.

References

External links
Biography at the Dictionary of Canadian Biography Online

1800 births
1880 deaths
19th-century Ministers of the Church of Scotland
Principals of Queen's University at Kingston